Büker is a surname. Notable people with the surname include:

 Evren Büker (born 1985), Turkish basketball player
 Heinz Büker (born 1941), West German sprint canoer

See also
 Buker, surname
 Bücker (disambiguation), includes a list of people with the surname Bücker
 Bucher, a surname

Turkish-language surnames